The 2005 Illinois State Redbirds football team represented Illinois State University as a member of the Gateway Football Conference during the 2005 NCAA Division I-AA football season. Led by sixth-year head coach Denver Johnson, the Redbirds compiled an overall record of 7–4 with a mark of 4–3 in conference play, tying for fourth place in the Gateway.  The team was ranked No. 22 in The Sports Network's postseason NCAA Division I-AA rankings. Illinois State played home games at Hancock Stadium in Normal, Illinois.

Schedule

References

Illinois State
Illinois State Redbirds football seasons
Illinois State Redbirds football